Christopher Gifford (born March 20, 1966 in Vancouver, British Columbia) is a former field hockey striker from Canada, who currently is working in management for a neutraceutical company. Married in August 1998 to his wife Sandra, he now has three children, Carson, Vanessa and Myles.

International senior competitions
 1987 – Pan American Games, Indianapolis (1st)
 1988 – Olympic Games, Seoul (11th)
 1989 – Intercontinental Cup, Madison, USA (2nd)
 1990 – World Cup, Lahore (11th)
 1991 – Pan American Games, Havana (2nd)
 1993 – Intercontinental Cup, Poznan (7th)
 1995 – Pan American Games, Mar del Plata (2nd)
 1996 – Olympic Qualifier, Barcelona (6th)
 1996 – World Cup Preliminary, Sardinia (2nd)
 1997 – World Cup Qualifier, Kuala Lumpur (5th)
 1998 – World Cup, Utrecht (8th)
 1999 – Pan American Games, Winnipeg (1st)
 2000 – Sultan Azlan Shah Cup, Kuala Lumpur (7th)
 2000 – Americas Cup, Cuba (2nd)
 2000 – Olympic Games, Sydney (10th)

References
 Profile

External links
 

1966 births
Living people
Canadian male field hockey players
Olympic field hockey players of Canada
Field hockey players at the 1988 Summer Olympics
Field hockey players at the 2000 Summer Olympics
Pan American Games gold medalists for Canada
Pan American Games silver medalists for Canada
Field hockey players at the 1987 Pan American Games
Field hockey players at the 1991 Pan American Games
Field hockey players at the 1995 Pan American Games
Field hockey players at the 1999 Pan American Games
Field hockey players from Vancouver
Pan American Games medalists in field hockey
1998 Men's Hockey World Cup players
Male field hockey forwards
Medalists at the 1995 Pan American Games
Medalists at the 1987 Pan American Games
Medalists at the 1991 Pan American Games